The Caproni Ca.66 and Caproni Ca.67 were Italian night bomber aircraft designed to re-equip the post-World War I Regia Aeronautica.

Design and development
The Ca.66 was a well built wooden aircraft with ply veneer and fabric covering, intended to carry out night bombing. The single-bay inverted sesquiplane wings were braced with streamlined struts and wires and were characterized by their squared off wing-tips, constant chord, and moderate 3° 30' dihedral on the lower mainplanes. The square section fuselage, rounded off at the nose, housed the four crew in three open cockpits with pilot and co-pilot side by side. At the aft end of the fuselage a large triangular fin, with rudder, supported the biplane tailplanes, which were also strut-braced. The tail-skid undercarriage had mainwheels on divided axles, strut-supported beneath the engines and attached to the lower longerons of the fuselage. Controls were conventional with elevators on upper and lower tailplanes, large horn-balanced rudder and horn balanced ailerons on the lower wings only.

The Ca.67 was similar to the Caproni Ca.66 in overall design and span but differed in having 2 Lorraine-Dietrich 12Db engines and increased payload. Flight tests offered no real improvement in performance over the Ca.66, and the Regia Aeronautica did not order the aircraft into production.

Variants
Ca.66 Inverted sesquiplane bomber powered by four  SPA 6A engines in strut-supported tandem pair nacelles between the mainplanes; one built.
Ca.67 A Ca.66 powered by two  Lorraine-Dietrich 12Db (Isotta Fraschini 12Db?) engines in tractor nacelles mounted on the lower mainplanes; one built.

Specifications (Ca.67)

References

Ca.067
1920s Italian bomber aircraft
Aircraft first flown in 1923
Biplanes
Twin-engined tractor aircraft